Ian Duncan Burnett, Baron Burnett of Maldon,  (born 28 February 1958) is a British judge and the current Lord Chief Justice of England and Wales.

Early life and education
Burnett was born on 28 February 1958. He was educated at St John's College, Portsmouth, and studied jurisprudence at Pembroke College, Oxford, where he became an honorary fellow in 2008.

Legal career
He was called to the bar at Middle Temple in 1980, and became a bencher there in 2001. From 1982, he practised at Temple Garden Chambers, serving as head of chambers from 2003. He was made a QC in 1998. He practised mainly in public and administrative law, acting on the inquiry into the 1987 Kings Cross fire, the inquiry into the convictions of the Guildford Four and Maguire Seven, the inquiries into the 1997 Southall and 1999 Ladbroke Grove rail crashes, and the inquests after the 1997 deaths of Diana, Princess of Wales, and Dodi Fayed.

Burnett served as an Assistant Recorder from 1998 to 2000, and then as a Recorder until 2008.  He also served as a deputy Judge of the High Court from 2008. He was appointed as a Judge of the High Court in 2008, in the Queen's Bench Division. Burnett was knighted on 7 November 2008. He sat in the Administrative Court and was presiding Judge of the Western Circuit 2011–14. He was promoted to the Court of Appeal in 2014, becoming a Lord Justice of Appeal.

It was announced in July 2017 that he would replace Lord Thomas of Cwmgiedd as Lord Chief Justice of England and Wales from 2 October 2017.

Aged 59, he became the youngest Lord Chief Justice since Lord Parker of Waddington in 1958. On 12 October 2017, it was announced that Burnett would be awarded a life peerage. He was created Baron Burnett of Maldon, of Maldon in the County of Essex, on 30 October 2017.

In November 2022, he announced his intention to stand down from his role as Lord Chief Justice from 30 September 2023.

Personal life
He married Caroline Ruth Monks in 1991, and they have one son and one daughter.

References

1958 births
Living people
People educated at St John's College, Portsmouth
Alumni of Pembroke College, Oxford
Members of the Middle Temple
Queen's Bench Division judges
Lords Justices of Appeal
Lord chief justices of England and Wales
Members of the Privy Council of the United Kingdom
Knights Bachelor
English King's Counsel
Life peers created by Elizabeth II